Randal Keith Orton (born April 1, 1980) is an American professional wrestler and actor. He is currently signed to WWE, where he performs on the Raw brand, but is currently out of action due to a back injury. With the third most world championship reigns in history, and a career spanning over 20 years, Orton is widely regarded as one of the greatest professional wrestlers of all time. 

Orton is a third-generation professional wrestler; his grandfather Bob Orton, father Bob Orton Jr., and uncle Barry Orton were all wrestlers. Before being signed by the World Wrestling Federation (WWF, now WWE), he trained in and wrestled for the Mid-Missouri Wrestling Association and Southern Illinois Conference Wrestling. He was then signed by the WWF and was sent to Ohio Valley Wrestling (OVW), where he held the OVW Hardcore Championship twice. He became a member of the stable Evolution shortly after his WWE debut, which quickly led to an Intercontinental Championship reign, his first championship with the company. He also acquired the moniker "The Legend Killer" during a storyline where he began disrespecting and then physically attacking WWE Hall of Famers and wrestling veterans.

At the age of 24, Orton became the youngest world champion in WWE history after he won the World Heavyweight Championship. With this win, he departed from Evolution and a feud with his former stablemates began. In 2006, Orton joined forces with Edge in a tag team known as Rated-RKO. Together, they held the World Tag Team Championship. After Rated-RKO disbanded in mid-2007, Orton gained two WWE Championship reigns in one night, becoming the second youngest two-time WWE Champion at the age of 27. He formed the group The Legacy with Cody Rhodes and Ted DiBiase Jr. in 2008. They disbanded in 2010, and Orton returned to singles competition. From 2013 to 2015, he was aligned with The Authority, who named him the "face of the WWE". In 2016, he joined The Wyatt Family, winning the SmackDown Tag Team Championship with Bray Wyatt and Luke Harper before turning on them in 2017. He won his first United States Championship in 2018, becoming the 18th overall Grand Slam Champion after already having been the 17th Triple Crown Champion.

Orton's rivalry with John Cena has been recognized as one of the longest and greatest rivalries in WWE history. Orton has held the WWE Championship 10 times and WWE's World Heavyweight Championship four times. He was the final holder of the World Heavyweight Championship, which he unified with the WWE Championship to become the WWE World Heavyweight Champion at TLC: Tables, Ladders & Chairs in 2013. Orton is recognized by WWE as having the third-most world championship victories in history at 14, behind John Cena and Ric Flair (both 16) and tied with Triple H (also 14). All totaled, he has won 20 championships in WWE.

Orton is also the winner of the 2013 Money in the Bank ladder match, as well as a two-time Royal Rumble match winner (2009 and 2017) and has headlined multiple WWE pay-per-view events, including WrestleMania 25 and WrestleMania XXX. Following his match at the 2021 Survivor Series, he broke Kane's record for wrestling the most PPV matches in WWE history.

Early life 

Randal Keith Orton was born in Knoxville, Tennessee, on April 1, 1980, the son of nurse Elaine and professional wrestler Bob Orton Jr. He is the grandson of Bob Orton and nephew of Barry Orton, both professional wrestlers. He has a younger brother named Nathan, who is a stand-up comedian, and a younger sister named Rebecca. Knowing the hardships of life as a professional wrestler, his parents tried to convince him to stay away from the business and his father warned him that life in the ring meant a life on the road and away from family.

Orton attended Hazelwood Central High School, where he was an amateur wrestler. After graduating in 1998, he enlisted with the Marines. At the base, he received a bad conduct discharge in 1999 after going AWOL on two occasions and disobeying an order from a commanding officer. Under the Uniform Code of Military Justice, he was tried and convicted under a special court-martial, subsequently spending 38 days in the brig at Camp Pendleton. He previously had a Marine tattoo on his left arm, but covered it up after receiving his bad conduct discharge.

Professional wrestling career

Training and early career (2000–2001) 
Orton made his wrestling debut in 2000 at the Mid-Missouri Wrestling Association-Southern Illinois Conference Wrestling (MMWA-SICW) in St. Louis, Missouri, an offshoot of the historic St. Louis Wrestling Club headed by Sam Muchnick. There, he was trained by both the staff of the promotion and his father, Bob Orton Jr. He wrestled for the promotion where he performed with wrestlers such as Ace Strange and Mark Bland. Orton also refereed a few matches with World Organized Wrestling (WOW), a promotion where his uncle Barry Orton worked.

World Wrestling Federation/Entertainment/WWE

Ohio Valley Wrestling (2000–2002) 
In 2000, Orton signed a deal with the then World Wrestling Federation (WWF) and was sent to its developmental territory, Ohio Valley Wrestling (OVW) in Louisville, Kentucky, where he continued his training. During his time in OVW, he wrestled the likes of Rico Constantino and The Prototype and teamed with Bobby Eaton during a tag team title tournament. He won the OVW Hardcore Championship twice by defeating Mr. Black on February 14, 2001, and Flash Flanagan on May 5, 2001, respectively. On several occasions he faced Rico Constantino on combined WWF/OVW events, and also lost to The Prototype (John Cena) in a tag match on July 28 in Jacksonville, Indiana. He also began appearing on several WWF house shows that were unaffiliated with OVW, the first being on May 1, 2001, when he faced Billy Gunn. After taking the mic and promising to beat Gunn, Orton was defeated. That fall he began appearing regularly on WWF house shows and dark matches, facing Chuck Palumbo, Steven Richards and Shawn Stasiak, but mostly wrestling in tag team matches. Orton's promotion to the main roster made him a member of OVW's now legendary Class of 2002 as part of what has now been dubbed as the OVW 4 alongside the aforementioned Cena as well as Brock Lesnar and Dave Bautista.

Evolution (2002–2004) 

One of Orton's first official WWF appearances was March 16, 2002, at WrestleMania X8's Fan Axxess, where he was defeated by Tommy Dreamer. Orton's first televised WWF match was a victory against Hardcore Holly on SmackDown! on April 25, 2002. Soon after, Orton became a face and was placed in a series of matches with Holly. In September 2002, Orton was traded to the Raw brand, where he defeated Stevie Richards in his debut on the show. Within weeks of his debut on the Raw brand, Orton suffered a shoulder injury, leaving him sidelined for months. While recovering, Orton still appeared on Raw in his own Randy News Network (RNN) segment, a weekly vignette featuring him talking about his condition. The show interrupted other segments of Raw programming, which caused Orton to slowly transition himself into a narcissistic and self-centered heel.

After his injury healed, Orton joined the Evolution stable, which consisted of Ric Flair, Triple H, and relative newcomer Batista. The group was pushed on Raw from 2003 to 2004, with the height of their dominance occurring after Armageddon in 2003 when all of the men's titles on Raw were held by Evolution members. In 2003, Orton spent much of his time helping Triple H overcome challenges for the World Heavyweight Championship. He joined Triple H in an Elimination Chamber match for the World Heavyweight Championship at SummerSlam, involved primarily to secure Triple H's title defense, and was eliminated by Goldberg, but the stable managed to fulfill its purpose and Triple H went on to eliminate Goldberg and retain his title.

Orton then began proclaiming himself the "Legend Killer", with his gimmick becoming that of a young upstart who was so talented that he touted himself as the future of wrestling. He embarked on numerous feuds with older, well-respected names in wrestling and gained infamy for blatantly disrespecting them. With the help of his stablemate and mentor Ric Flair, Orton defeated Shawn Michaels at Unforgiven in the first of many high-profile matches billed as "Legend vs. Legend Killer". During this time, Orton began using the move that would become his signature finisher, the RKO, a jumping cutter named after his initials. He defeated Rob Van Dam for the Intercontinental Championship at Armageddon in December 2003. With this win, Orton started the longest Intercontinental Championship reign in seven years, holding the title for 210 days. Orton continued to establish himself as a "Legend Killer" throughout 2004, challenging the semi-retired wrestler Mick Foley. Famed for his brutal hardcore matches and ability to handle excruciating pain, Foley challenged Orton to a hardcore "Legend vs. Legend Killer" match for his Intercontinental Championship, which Orton reluctantly accepted. At Backlash, Orton defeated Foley in a hardcore match to retain the Intercontinental Championship, which included spots involving a table covered in barbed wire, fire, a baseball bat wrapped in barbed wire (a signature weapon of Foley's named "Barbie"), and Orton being thrown onto hundreds of thumbtacks. Orton later spat in the face of Harley Race on the April 26 episode of Raw. Two months later at Bad Blood, he retained the Intercontinental Championship against Shelton Benjamin. In July at Vengeance, he lost the title to Edge.

World Heavyweight Champion (2004–2005) 

After losing the Intercontinental Championship, Orton became the number one contender for the World Heavyweight Championship after winning a 20-man battle royal on July 26. At SummerSlam, Orton defeated Chris Benoit for the championship, thus becoming the youngest world champion in WWE history at the age of 24. Benoit congratulated Orton after the match, shaking his hand for showing the ability to "be a man". The following night on Raw, after Orton successfully defended the title against Benoit in a rematch, Evolution threw Orton a mock celebration only to reveal that they were not pleased with his new victory. While Batista had Orton propped on his shoulders in elation, Triple H gave him a pleased thumbs-up and then abruptly changed it to a thumbs-down, which was followed by Batista dropping Orton to the mat. Triple H, Flair and Batista attacked Orton in the ring, resulting in Orton being kicked out of Evolution. The following week, he called out Orton and ordered him to hand over the championship, but he refused, spitting in Triple H's face and hitting him with the title belt. Orton's breakup with Evolution led to him turning face when he continued to feud with his former stablemates. A month later, Orton lost the World Heavyweight Championship to Triple H at Unforgiven after interference from Flair, Batista, and Jonathan Coachman.

Seeking revenge, Orton lashed out at his former Evolution members, catching them by surprise during a show by giving them a large cake as a make-up gift, which he came out of nowhere to beat and humiliate the group. At Taboo Tuesday, Orton defeated Ric Flair in a steel cage match. After this, Orton experienced another push, becoming general manager of the Raw brand for a week following a match stipulation at Survivor Series where he picked up the win for his team by last eliminating Triple H in a four-on-four Survivor Series elimination match. He continued to feud with Triple H, using his authority to place his opponents at severe disadvantages during title defenses. In January 2005 at New Year's Revolution, Orton participated in an Elimination Chamber match for the vacant World Heavyweight Championship, where he was the last man eliminated by Triple H after interference from Ric Flair and Batista. On the January 10 episode of Raw, Orton defeated Batista to earn a match against Triple H at the Royal Rumble for the World Heavyweight title, which he lost.

Feud with The Undertaker (2005–2006) 
Orton began an on-screen relationship with Stacy Keibler and briefly feuded with Christian in February 2005. On the February 28 Raw, Superstar Billy Graham made an appearance, in which he advised Orton to "go where no wrestler [had] gone before".

Orton then produced a copy of SmackDown! magazine, which featured The Undertaker on the cover. Heeding Graham's advice, Orton said he would set himself apart from all other wrestlers by ending The Undertaker's undefeated streak at WrestleMania. Throughout March 2005, Orton taunted The Undertaker, claiming he was unafraid of him. On the March 21 Raw, Orton turned heel once again after he delivered an RKO to his unsuspecting on-screen girlfriend, Stacy Keibler, knocking her unconscious. During Orton's promos, he ran for cover whenever signs of The Undertaker's appearance (lightning, darkness, or smoke) occurred. When wrestler Jake Roberts advised Orton not to underestimate The Undertaker, Orton performed an RKO on Roberts as well. In the weeks leading up to WrestleMania, Orton became more defiant and unafraid of The Undertaker, taunting and assaulting him in the ring following distractions from his father, "Cowboy" Bob Orton. At WrestleMania 21, Orton lost the heavily hyped match.

The next night on Raw, Orton faced Batista, who had become World Heavyweight Champion. Orton stated on-screen that his match with The Undertaker had aggravated a shoulder injury. While sidelined, Orton appeared on Raw and claimed that he was ineligible for the WWE Draft Lottery due to his injury. He was informed by WWE Chairman Vince McMahon that he was indeed a candidate for the draft, leaving a possibility of a return to SmackDown! Orton returned to WWE programming for SmackDown! on June 16, announcing that he was the second pick in the 2005 draft lottery. He rekindled his feud with The Undertaker, defeating him at SummerSlam following a distraction from his father. Two months later at No Mercy, Orton and his father Bob Orton defeated The Undertaker in a handicap casket match and after the match, Randy Orton and his father Bob locked the Undertaker in the casket and, in a move similar to Kane at the 1998 Royal Rumble, chopped holes in the top of the casket with an axe, poured gasoline over the casket and set it ablaze, kayfabe killing The Undertaker. The following month, Orton replaced the late Eddie Guerrero as a participant in the annual elimination match of Team SmackDown! against Team Raw at Survivor Series, after having lost a qualifying match to Rey Mysterio. In the match, Orton was the last remaining wrestler in the match for the third straight year, as he pinned Shawn Michaels to get the victory for Team SmackDown!. After the match, The Undertaker returned by emerging from a flaming casket and attacked the SmackDown! superstars who came to the ring to celebrate Team SmackDown!'s victory. On the SmackDown! episode after Survivor Series, The Undertaker interfered in a match between Rey Mysterio and Big Show after Kane interfered. Randy Orton RKO'd the Undertaker, he then struck the Undertaker with a tire iron and set him on the back of the lowrider Mysterio had driven to the ring, he then reversed the lowrider into the SmackDown! set, causing an explosion. The feud was finally settled with a Hell in a Cell match at Armageddon. On the December 16 episode of SmackDown!, The Undertaker entered the ring to deliver a promo while one of his druids appeared to be standing in the ring. The Undertaker sustained an RKO from Orton in a surprise attack. The druid revealed himself to be Orton's father, who gave Orton The Undertaker's urn, which according to the storyline allowed whoever held it to control The Undertaker. The Undertaker, however, beat Orton in the Hell in a Cell match at Armageddon, ending their nine-month-long feud.

Rated-RKO (2006–2007) 

After Armageddon, Orton entered the 2006 Royal Rumble match as the thirtieth and final wrestler, but he was eliminated by the eventual winner of the match Rey Mysterio, who earned a world championship at WrestleMania 22. Orton challenged him to a match for his title shot at No Way Out. In the weeks preceding No Way Out, Orton made controversial remarks about Eddie Guerrero, Mysterio's friend who had died a few months previously, in an attempt to gain villain heat. Many fans felt the comments were highly distasteful so soon after Guerrero's death in November 2005. Orton won at No Way Out, earning Mysterio's title shot for the World Heavyweight Championship at WrestleMania 22. SmackDown! General Manager Theodore Long re-added Mysterio to the WrestleMania 22 title match, making it a triple threat match between Orton, Mysterio and then-champion Kurt Angle. On April 2 at WrestleMania, however, Orton lost after he was pinned by Mysterio. On the following episode of SmackDown!, Orton challenged Mysterio for the World Heavyweight Championship, but failed to win the title.

On April 4, Orton was suspended for sixty days for "unprofessional conduct". In an interview, Orton stated, "my conduct was unbecoming of a champion, which is what I will be again when I return". To cover for the suspension, a scripted injury was devised, where Kurt Angle broke Orton's ankle during a King of the Ring quarterfinal match. Orton returned from his suspension in June to the Raw brand, where he entered a rivalry with Angle, culminating in matches at ECW One Night Stand (which he lost) and Vengeance (which he won) before engaging in a storyline feud with Hulk Hogan. Orton began cutting promos insulting the aging Hogan and flirted with Hogan's then-eighteen-year-old daughter Brooke. At SummerSlam, the two met in a "Legend vs. Legend Killer" match, which Hogan won. He later defeated Carlito, at Unforgiven the following month.

After the newly reformed D-Generation X (DX) (Triple H and Shawn Michaels) cost Edge the WWE Championship, Edge approached Orton and asked him to join forces to defeat the team. Orton, whose championship reign had been ended by Triple H in 2004, agreed, forming the tag team Rated-RKO. The two defeated DX at Cyber Sunday with help from special guest referee Eric Bischoff, becoming the first team to defeat DX since their reunion in June and they quickly dominated the Raw brand's tag team division to become World Tag Team Champions by defeating Ric Flair and Roddy Piper on the November 13 episode of Raw. As part of the angle, Rated-RKO attacked Ric Flair with steel chairs to enrage DX on the November 27 episode of Raw. At New Year's Revolution, Rated-RKO defended the World Tag Team Championship against DX, but the match was declared a no-contest when Triple H suffered a legitimate injury during the match. Afterwards, Rated-RKO were attacked by DX. With Triple H out of action, Rated-RKO continued their on-screen rivalry with Michaels. At the Royal Rumble, both men competed in the eponymous match and made it to the final four, but both were eliminated by Michaels. Michaels later teamed with WWE Champion John Cena to defeat Rated-RKO to win the World Tag Team Championship the following night on Raw. After losing the tag team titles, both Edge and Orton focused on the WWE Championship, causing friction between them. On the February 5, 2007 episode of Raw, they lost a triple threat match against Michaels to earn a WWE Championship match at WrestleMania 23. They both competed in the Money in the Bank ladder match at WrestleMania, but the match was won by Mr. Kennedy. On the April 9 episode of Raw, Orton and Michaels wrestled to a no contest in a number one contender's match for the WWE Championship after both men's shoulders were down during the pinfall. Finally, Orton and Edge faced off in a fatal four-way match for the title against Cena and Michaels at Backlash, however Cena retained the title after pinning Orton. On the April 30 episode of Raw, they competed against each other in a singles match, which Edge won. Their alliance was effectively ended once Edge joined the SmackDown! brand. Orton then continued his "Legend Killer" persona, attacking Shawn Michaels by using frequent attacks to the head, including an elevated DDT and a running punt to the face. Orton defeated Michaels at Judgment Day via knockout when Michaels suffered a kayfabe concussion and collapsed during the match. Orton continued his attacks when he engaged himself in feuds with Rob Van Dam at One Night Stand (after losing a stretcher match to Van Dam), Ric Flair, Dusty Rhodes, and Sgt. Slaughter. During this time the commentators noted how Orton slithered around and stalked his victims like a snake; this led to "The Viper" becoming a nickname for Orton.

WWE Champion (2007–2008) 

On the July 23 episode of Raw, Orton was named number one contender for John Cena's WWE Championship. Three times before their scheduled bout at SummerSlam, Orton assaulted Cena with the RKO. Orton lost the title match at SummerSlam when Cena pinned him after an FU. The next night on the August 27 episode of Raw, Orton demanded a rematch, but Raw General Manager William Regal denied him. He then appealed to Mr. McMahon, who offered him the shot if he "proved himself". That night, Orton interfered in Cena's match with King Booker, assaulting him before kicking his father, who was at ringside, in the head. McMahon granted Orton his rematch at Unforgiven, which he won by disqualification when Cena refused to stop punching him in the corner; however, Cena retained the championship because titles cannot change hands by disqualification. After the match, Cena's father, who was again at ringside, kicked Orton in the head, which led to a match the next night on the September 17 episode of Raw, in which Orton defeated Cena's father by disqualification, then hit him with an RKO while Cena was handcuffed to the ropes. Cena suffered a legitimate injury during a match with Mr. Kennedy on the October 1 episode of Raw, after which Orton attacked Cena with an RKO. After this, he adopted the nickname of "The Viper". Orton then threw him outside the ring, and gave him an RKO on the broadcast table. Due to this injury, John Cena was forced to vacate the WWE Championship.

At the start of No Mercy, Mr. McMahon awarded Randy Orton the WWE Championship, which John Cena had vacated due to injury. Orton lost the title to Triple H in the opening match, but regained it later that night in a Last Man Standing match. Orton then restarted his feud with Shawn Michaels, who returned on the October 8 episode of Raw during Orton's championship coronation and superkicked him. Michaels was chosen by fan voting over Jeff Hardy and Mr. Kennedy to meet Orton for the WWE Championship at Cyber Sunday, where Orton was disqualified after low blowing Michaels, but retained the title. They had a rematch at Survivor Series with a pre-match stipulation that if Michaels had used Sweet Chin Music, he would have lost and never had another chance at the title, while if Orton was disqualified, he would have lost the championship; Orton pinned Michaels at Survivor Series after an RKO to retain the title. Orton then began a feud with the returning Chris Jericho, who challenged Orton for the WWE Championship at Armageddon, in which Jericho won by disqualification after interference from SmackDown! color commentator John "Bradshaw" Layfield (JBL), but Orton retained the title. He then feuded with Jeff Hardy, during which he punted Hardy's brother Matt in the head and Hardy performed a Swanton Bomb off the Raw set onto Orton. He successfully defended the title against Hardy at the Royal Rumble. He then restarted his feud with John Cena, who had returned from injury to win the 2008 Royal Rumble match. Instead of taking his title shot at WrestleMania XXIV, as Royal Rumble winners typically do, Cena took it at No Way Out and defeated Orton, who intentionally got himself disqualified by slapping the referee to retain the title. The following night on Raw, Cena defeated Orton in a non-title match with Triple H as the special guest referee, resulting in Cena being added to Orton's title match with Triple H at WrestleMania, making it a triple threat match. At WrestleMania, Orton retained the WWE Championship against Cena and Triple H by pinning Cena after Triple H executed a Pedigree on him. The next month at Backlash, Orton lost the title to Triple H in a fatal four-way elimination match, also including Cena and John "Bradshaw" Layfield (JBL). After failing to win it back at Judgment Day in a steel cage match, he faced Triple H for the title once more in a Last Man Standing match at One Night Stand, which he lost after Triple H countered an RKO by throwing Orton over the top rope, legitimately breaking his collarbone and putting him out of action. During this time, he gained a new entrance theme, "Voices", performed by the band Rev Theory.

The Legacy (2008–2010) 

Upon being medically cleared to return to the ring, Orton was reinjured in a motorcycle accident. He returned to Raw on September 1, criticizing all the champions, including World Tag Team Champions Cody Rhodes and Ted DiBiase, who he berated and slapped for letting Cryme Tyme steal their belts. This inspired them to try to gain Orton's respect. They achieved this at Unforgiven when, with new stablemate Manu, they assaulted World Heavyweight Champion CM Punk, forcing him to vacate his title before his scheduled defense that night. Orton returned to in-ring action on the November 3 episode of Raw, losing to Punk by disqualification when DiBiase interfered, resulting in Orton punting DiBiase in the head in retaliation. At Survivor Series, Team Orton, which included Rhodes, defeated Team Batista with both Orton and Rhodes surviving as the sole survivors. On the December 1 episode of Raw, Orton proposed that he, Rhodes and Manu form an alliance. The stable, called "The Legacy", debuted the next week, defeating Batista and Triple H, Orton's former Evolution stablemates, in a three-on-two handicap match. At Armageddon, Orton lost to Batista in a singles match.

Orton began feuding with the McMahon family on the January 19, 2009 episode of Raw when he confronted both Mr. McMahon and Stephanie, claiming that he was worth more than her, and that she had become "worthless". This infuriated Mr. McMahon, who demanded that Orton apologize, or he'd terminate him on the spot. As Mr. McMahon was about to fire him, Orton attacked and punted him in the head, leading to him being carried out of the arena on a stretcher. On January 25, Orton won the Royal Rumble match, last eliminating Triple H. The next night on Raw, Orton claimed that he suffered from IED, and that he was not responsible for his actions towards Mr. McMahon, claiming that he suffered a "loss of control" because of the disorder. He also claimed that WWE knew of the condition, but did nothing, and threatened to sue WWE for that reason, and also, if Stephanie were to fire him, threatened a second lawsuit for breach of contract, due to the fact that he was legally entitled to compete at WrestleMania because he won the Royal Rumble. Though Stephanie teased firing Orton, she changed her mind and said that she had "bigger plans", leading to Shane McMahon returning to Raw and attacking Orton. This led to Orton facing Shane in a No Holds Barred match at No Way Out, which he won. The next night on Raw, Orton faced Shane again in an unsanctioned match, which ended in a no contest when he punted Shane in the head, thus rendering him unable to continue the match. Stephanie then ran down to the ring to tend to her brother, but Orton attacked her with an RKO. This drew Triple H into the feud, who claimed that Orton "crossed the line" when he attacked Stephanie, his real-life wife. Later, Orton claimed that everything he had done was part of a plan to get revenge on Triple H after he kicked him out of Evolution back in 2004; according to Orton, Triple H "ruined his life", so Orton was going to do the same and take everything that Triple H cared about away from him. He challenged Triple H for the WWE Championship at WrestleMania 25, where he was unsuccessful. He won it the next month at Backlash by pinning Triple H in a six-man tag team match between The Legacy and Triple H, Batista and Shane McMahon. At Judgment Day, Orton defended the championship against Batista, where he retained via disqualification after Rhodes and DiBiase interfered. At Extreme Rules, he lost the title to Batista in a steel cage match. The following night on Raw, Orton and Legacy attacked Batista and injured his arm, forcing him to vacate the title. On the June 15 episode of Raw, Orton regained the title in a fatal four-way match against Big Show, Triple H and John Cena. The following week, Orton defended the WWE Championship against Triple H in a Last Man Standing match, which ended in a no-contest after both men failed to answer the referee's ten count. They faced off for the championship once more at The Bash in a Three Stages of Hell match, which Orton won after interference from Legacy. At SummerSlam, he defended the title against John Cena, during which he used several underhanded tactics to retain the championship. He lost the title to Cena in an "I Quit" match at Breaking Point, but regained it from Cena in a Hell in a Cell match at Hell in a Cell. At Bragging Rights, Orton again lost the championship to Cena in a one-hour Iron Man match to end the feud.

Orton then began a rivalry with Kofi Kingston, whom Orton blamed for him losing the WWE Championship due to Kingston interfering in his match with Cena to chase away Rhodes and DiBiase. On the November 16 episode of Raw, Orton and Kingston engaged in a brawl that ended with Kingston putting Orton through a table in the crowd. Both men were named captains for their respective teams at Survivor Series, where Kingston's team defeated Orton's team after Orton was last eliminated by Kingston. The two traded victories over each on following episodes of Raw, leading to a match at TLC: Tables, Ladders & Chairs on December 13, which Orton won. The next night, he competed in a tournament to crown the 2009 Superstar of the Year, defeating The Undertaker by countout in the first round after interference from Legacy to advance to the finals later that night, where he lost to Cena. Orton won a triple threat match on January 11, 2010, episode of Raw, with help from Rhodes and DiBiase, for the right to challenge Sheamus at the Royal Rumble for the WWE Championship. Orton lost by disqualification when Rhodes interfered, which prompted Orton to attack both Rhodes and DiBiase after the match. On the February 15 episode of Raw, Orton was again disqualified in a non-title rematch when Legacy interfered. Orton and DiBiase both competed in the WWE Championship Elimination Chamber match at Elimination Chamber, where DiBiase eliminated Orton after hitting him with a pipe Rhodes had given him. The next night on the February 22 episode of Raw, during a six-man tag team match, Orton attacked them in retaliation, turning him face. At WrestleMania XXVI, Orton defeated Rhodes and DiBiase in a triple threat match.

World Heavyweight Championship reigns (2010–2013) 
After The Legacy disbanded, Orton spent most part of the year in World Title feuds. He unsuccessfully challenged Jack Swagger for the World Heavyweight Championship at Extreme Rules in April. At Fatal 4-Way in June, Orton competed in a fatal four-way WWE Championship match involving champion Cena, Edge, and Sheamus, who won the title after interference from The Nexus. On July 18 at Money in the Bank, Orton competed in a Money in the Bank ladder match for a WWE Championship contract, which was won by The Miz and, at SummerSlam, he faced the WWE Champion Sheamus in a match that ended in a disqualification, giving Orton the win, but not the title. Immediately afterward, Orton hit Sheamus with the chair and an RKO onto the broadcast table.

At Night of Champions, Orton won the WWE Championship in a six-pack challenge elimination match. After successfully defending the title against Sheamus in a Hell in a Cell match at Hell in a Cell, He feuded with Wade Barrett, who was blackmailing Cena to help him capture the title. Orton retained the title against him at Bragging Rights and Survivor Series. However, on the November 22 episode of Raw, after Orton defeated Barrett again in a title match, he lost the championship against The Miz when he cashed his Money in the Bank contract. Orton received his rematch against The Miz in a tables match at TLC: Tables, Ladders & Chairs and the Royal Rumble, but he lost both matches.

The next month at Elimination Chamber, Orton failed to win a WWE Championship number one contender Elimination Chamber match after being eliminated by CM Punk. Over the next three weeks, Orton punted and injured all members of The New Nexus, Michael McGillicutty, David Otunga and Mason Ryan. At WrestleMania XXVII, Orton defeated Punk after a mid-air RKO. Two weeks later in the 2011 WWE draft, Orton was drafted to the SmackDown brand and later beat Punk in a Last Man Standing Match at Extreme Rules, ending his feud with The New Nexus.

On the May 6 episode of SmackDown, Orton defeated Christian to win the World Heavyweight Championship for the second time. At Over the Limit, Orton made his first successful title defense in a rematch against Christian. At Capitol Punishment, Orton pinned Christian to retain the championship again, despite Christian's foot being under the bottom rope. In July at Money in the Bank, Orton defended the championship against Christian once more, with the stipulation that if Orton got himself disqualified, or if there was "bad officiating", Christian would win the title. Christian spat in Orton's face, causing him to lose control of his temper, kick Christian in the groin and get disqualified, resulting in Orton losing the championship. A month later at SummerSlam, Orton regained the title when he defeated Christian in a No Holds Barred match. Orton ended his feud with Christian when he retained the World Heavyweight Championship in a steel cage match on the August 30 episode of SmackDown. Orton then began a feud with Mark Henry after Henry became the number one contender to the World Heavyweight Championship. Over the next few weeks, Henry regularly attacked Orton. At Night of Champions, Orton lost the World Heavyweight Championship to Henry, and failed to regain it two weeks later in a Hell in a Cell match at Hell in a Cell. He then began feuding with his former stablemate Cody Rhodes, who believed that Orton had mistreated and abused him during their time together in Legacy. On the October 14 episode of SmackDown, Orton won a 41-man battle royal to earn a title shot of his choice, and he chose to challenge Henry for the World Heavyweight Championship later that night; he won by disqualification after interference from Rhodes, but did not win the championship. He then defeated Rhodes at Vengeance, and again on the November 4 SmackDown in a Street Fight.

Orton reignited his feud with Wade Barrett after both were named captain for a traditional 5-on-5 Survivor Series elimination match. On the November 11 episode of SmackDown, Orton lost a match to Barrett after Barrett poked Orton in the eye. On the November 14 episode of Raw, Orton won a rematch by disqualification after Team Barrett interfered. Orton's team was defeated at Survivor Series with Barrett and Cody Rhodes being the sole survivors. Barrett then began attacking and distracting Orton during matches. At TLC: Tables, Ladders, & Chairs, Orton defeated Barrett in a tables match after he put Barrett through the table with an RKO. Barrett and Orton continued their feud on the December 23 episode of SmackDown, where they brawled backstage and Orton hit Barrett with an RKO onto a car. This led to a Falls Count Anywhere match on December 30 episode of SmackDown, in which Barrett pushed Orton down a flight of stairs, resulting in a herniated disc, which sidelined Orton for four weeks. On the January 27, 2012 episode of SmackDown, he returned to the ring and attacked Barrett. On the February 3 episode of SmackDown, Orton defeated Barrett in a No Disqualification match to end the feud.

On the February 13 episode of Raw, Orton suffered a concussion after World Heavyweight Champion Daniel Bryan smashed Orton over the head with the title belt. Due to the injury, Orton was taken out of his Elimination Chamber match for the World Heavyweight Championship at Elimination Chamber. When Orton returned on the March 2 episode of SmackDown, he feuded with Kane and was defeated by him at WrestleMania XXVIII. Orton defeated Kane on the next SmackDown in a No Disqualification rematch and at Extreme Rules in a Falls Count Anywhere match to end the feud. He participated in a fatal four-way match at Over the Limit for the World Heavyweight Championship, where Orton failed to win after Sheamus pinned Chris Jericho to retain the title. On May 30, WWE suspended Orton for 60 days due to his second violation of the company's Talent Wellness Program.

Orton returned on the July 30 episode of Raw defeating Heath Slater. Orton began feuding with Mr. Money in the Bank Dolph Ziggler and defeated Ziggler at Night of Champions. He began feuding with Alberto Del Rio on the September 28 episode of SmackDown. Orton defeated Del Rio at Hell in a Cell in a singles match and represented Team Foley as his team lost to Team Ziggler at Survivor Series in a traditional five-on-five elimination tag match.

On the December 3 episode of Raw, Orton began a feud with The Shield, after he was attacked by them following a victory over Brad Maddox. On the December 14 episode of SmackDown, Orton was once again assaulted backstage by The Shield. This was used to write him off television due to a shoulder injury. Orton returned on the December 31 episode of Raw, helping Ryback and Sheamus fend off The Shield. At Elimination Chamber, Orton eliminated Mark Henry and Chris Jericho before being the last man eliminated by Jack Swagger. In late February, Orton aligned himself with Sheamus to feud with the Shield. At WrestleMania 29, Orton, Sheamus and Big Show were defeated by The Shield, after which, both men were knocked out by Big Show. The following night on Raw, Orton and Sheamus faced off in a match to earn a match with Big Show, however, the match ended in a no contest after Big Show interfered. Orton and Sheamus then teamed up to defeat Big Show in two handicap matches, first on the April 12 SmackDown via count-out, and second on the April 15 Raw via pinfall. The feud between Big Show and Orton led to an Extreme Rules match at Extreme Rules, which Orton won.

After Extreme Rules, Orton began pairing with Daniel Bryan to face the Shield. On the June 14 SmackDown, Orton teamed with Bryan and Kane to end the Shield's unpinned and unsubmitted streak in televised six-man tag matches. Three days later at Payback, Orton and Bryan unsuccessfully challenged for Roman Reigns and Seth Rollins' WWE Tag Team Championship. The following night on Raw, Orton and Bryan faced off in a No Disqualification match, which Orton won via referee stoppage after Bryan suffered a legitimate nerve injury. Four days later on SmackDown, Orton was defeated by Bryan in a singles match via countout. Orton and Bryan faced each other for the third time on the next Raw, but their match ended in a no-contest after both men were counted out. Later that night, Orton was defeated by Bryan in a Street Fight Match after he was forced to submit to the Yes! Lock with a kendo stick applied to the move.

The Authority (2013–2015) 

On July 14 at Money in the Bank, Orton defeated Christian, CM Punk, Daniel Bryan, Rob Van Dam, and Sheamus to win the WWE Championship Money in the Bank ladder match, thus earning him an opportunity to challenge for the WWE Championship at a time of his choosing within the next year. On August 18 at SummerSlam, Orton turned heel after he cashed in his Money in the Bank contract on Daniel Bryan, who had just won the WWE Championship and had been subsequently attacked by special guest referee Triple H, who also counted the pinfall to give Orton his seventh WWE Championship. The following night on Raw, Orton was endorsed as the "face of the company" by Vince McMahon and the newly formed Authority (Triple H and Stephanie McMahon). On September 15 at Night of Champions, Orton lost the WWE Championship back to Bryan, however, Triple H stripped Bryan of the title the next night on Raw, due to a fast count by referee Scott Armstrong, but refused to give the championship back to Orton. Orton and Bryan faced off for the vacant title on October 6 at Battleground, but the match ended in a no contest after Big Show interfered and knocked out both men. Orton once again challenged Bryan for the vacant championship at Hell in a Cell, where he was successful in regaining the WWE Championship after the special guest referee Shawn Michaels hit Bryan with Sweet Chin Music for attacking Triple H. On November 24 at Survivor Series, after retaining the title against Big Show, Orton was confronted by World Heavyweight Champion and long-time rival John Cena. The following night on Raw, Cena suggested that there should only be "one champion" in WWE, so Triple H stated there would be a unification match at the TLC pay-per-view. On December 15, Orton defeated Cena at TLC to unify both titles, and becoming the first WWE World Heavyweight Champion as well as officially being recognized as the final World Heavyweight Champion. Orton retained the title at the Royal Rumble against Cena after interference by The Wyatt Family. On February 23 at Elimination Chamber, Orton defeated Cesaro, Christian, Daniel Bryan, John Cena, and Sheamus to retain his WWE World Heavyweight Championship and secure his position in the title bout at WrestleMania XXX against Royal Rumble winner Batista. On April 6 at WrestleMania XXX, the main event was changed to a triple threat match after Bryan defeated Triple H earlier that night, and Bryan won the match after making Batista submit to end Orton's reign at 161 days.

The following night on Raw, Orton and Batista were each denied a rematch for the WWE World Heavyweight Championship and instead were forced by The Authority to team together to face The Usos for the WWE Tag Team Championship, despite their issues with one another. The title match ended in a double count-out after the two united and attacked them. Later that night, Orton and Batista, along with Kane, attacked Bryan before he was set to defend his title against Triple H. Before Triple H could defeat Bryan, The Shield interrupted by spearing Triple H and taking out Orton, Batista, and Kane, causing the match to end in a no-contest. On the April 14 episode of Raw, Orton, Batista, and Triple H came down to the ring to attack The Shield after their 11-on-3 handicap match, using the name and the theme of Evolution. At Extreme Rules and Payback, Evolution lost to The Shield. On the June 9 episode of Raw, The Authority automatically granted Orton a spot in the 2014 Money in the Bank ladder match for the vacant WWE World Heavyweight Championship, but he failed to win. On the July 21 episode of Raw, Roman Reigns attacked Orton, which cost him another shot at the title, causing Orton to retaliate the following week by viciously attacking Reigns and challenging him to a match at SummerSlam, which Reigns won. At Night of Champions, Orton defeated Chris Jericho.

On the October 13 episode of Raw, Orton asked The Authority to face the loser of a No Holds Barred Contract on a Pole match between John Cena and Dean Ambrose. Ambrose won the match, setting up a Hell in a Cell match between Orton and Cena. On the Raw before the event, Triple H revealed that the winner would receive a future WWE World Heavyweight Championship match against Brock Lesnar. Later that night, Orton, Kane, and Seth Rollins defeated Cena and Ambrose in a handicap Street Fight after Orton pinned Ambrose, but he was immediately attacked by Rollins with a Curb Stomp post-match. At Hell in a Cell, Orton lost to Cena. On the October 27 episode of Raw, Orton attacked Rollins, turning face in the process. The following week on Raw, Orton attacked Rollins during his Intercontinental Championship match against Dolph Ziggler, and demanded a match with Rollins to settle their dispute, which Triple H granted in order to keep Orton on their side. Rollins won, and Orton attacked The Authority before being attacked by The Authority, which ended with Rollins executing a Curb Stomp onto the steel steps on Orton. He was carried on a stretcher after he sustained a scripted injury, so he could start filming The Condemned 2.

After a three-month hiatus, Orton returned at Fastlane on February 22, 2015, by saving Dolph Ziggler, Erick Rowan and Ryback from a post-match beatdown of Rollins, Big Show and Kane. He feuded with The Authority's Seth Rollins, having a match at WrestleMania 31 where Orton defeated Rollins. After WrestleMania, with Rollins as the new WWE World Heavyweight Champion, Orton faced Rollins at Extreme Rules and Payback, losing both title matches.

At Money in the Bank, Orton failed to win the championship contract ladder match, which was won by Sheamus. Following this, Orton began feuding with Sheamus after both men attacked each other and faced off in various tag-team matches; Orton defeated Sheamus at Battleground, but lost to Sheamus at SummerSlam. On the September 7 episode of Raw, Orton was attacked by The Wyatt Family, starting a feud that was booked to end in the Hell in a Cell pre-show, but canceled after Orton suffered a legit shoulder injury, putting him out of action for the following months.

The Wyatt Family (2016–2017) 
On the July 7, 2016 episode of SmackDown, Orton was revealed as Brock Lesnar's opponent for SummerSlam. On July 19 at the 2016 WWE draft, Orton was drafted to SmackDown, while Lesnar was drafted to Raw. On July 24 at Battleground, Orton returned as a guest on Chris Jericho's Highlight Reel to be interviewed about his match with Lesnar. Orton explained that he wanted to face Lesnar to prove that he belonged in the top spot, before executing an RKO on Jericho. On the July 26 episode of SmackDown Live, Orton interrupted Intercontinental Champion The Miz during his Miz TV segment before defeating Miz in a non-title match. During Lesnar's promo on the August 1 episode of Raw, Orton appeared and delivered an RKO to Lesnar. The following night on SmackDown Live, Lesnar attacked Orton during his match, delivering an F-5 to Orton. At SummerSlam, Lesnar defeated Orton by technical knockout after a series of elbows to the head, leaving Orton with an open wound that required 10 staples.

On the August 23 episode of SmackDown Live, Orton spoke about his match against Lesnar and declared that he and Lesnar would cross paths again before Bray Wyatt interrupted him, therefore resuming their feud. The following week on SmackDown Live, Orton accepted Wyatt's challenge for a match at Backlash, where Orton lost by forfeit after a backstage attack by Wyatt before the show. It was later revealed that Orton was not cleared to wrestle at the event due to a legitimate concussion that occurred the previous month at SummerSlam. Orton faced Wyatt at No Mercy, where he lost due to a distraction by the returning Luke Harper. On the October 11 episode of SmackDown Live, Orton was teamed with Kane in a tag team match against Wyatt and Harper, but once again lost the match due to distraction by Harper. On the October 25 episode of SmackDown Live, Orton interfered on Wyatt's behalf in his match with Kane, leading to speculation that he had joined The Wyatt Family, though this was neither confirmed nor denied by WWE or Orton. On the November 1 episode of SmackDown Live, Wyatt and Harper helped Orton win his match against Kane, thus confirming Orton's alliance with the group, turning heel in the process.

That same night, Orton and Wyatt were revealed as members of Team SmackDown for Survivor Series. At Survivor Series, Team SmackDown defeated Team Raw, where Orton and Wyatt became the last two surviving members of their team. On the November 29 episode of SmackDown Live, Orton and Wyatt defeated American Alpha to earn a shot at the SmackDown Tag Team Championship against Heath Slater and Rhyno. At TLC: Tables, Ladders & Chairs, they won the titles, marking Orton's first tag team championship in a decade. It was later announced that Harper was also champion under the Freebird Rule. On the December 27 episode of SmackDown Live, they lost the SmackDown Tag Team Championship to American Alpha in a fatal four-way tag team elimination match, after Orton accidentally hit Harper. On January 29, 2017, at the Royal Rumble, Orton won the Royal Rumble match for the second time in his career by lastly eliminating Roman Reigns. Despite this, Orton came out after Wyatt successfully defended the WWE Championship and relinquished his shot at the title on the February 14 episode of SmackDown Live, basically giving his full devotion to Wyatt and leaving the main event of WrestleMania in the air. On the February 28 episode of SmackDown Live, Orton turned on Wyatt while Wyatt was delivering his promo and was seen entering Wyatt's compound, where he claimed that despite being Wyatt's home, it was not his home and declared his intentions to burn the soul of "Sister Abigail". He then set the entire compound on fire after stating that he would face Wyatt at WrestleMania 33, turning face again. On the March 7 episode of SmackDown Live, Orton defeated AJ Styles to become the number one contender for the WWE Championship. On April 2 at WrestleMania 33, Orton defeated Wyatt to win the WWE Championship for the ninth time, which was also his first WWE Championship win at WrestleMania and 13th overall world championship. On the following episode of SmackDown Live, Wyatt challenged Orton to a "House of Horrors" rematch, but after Wyatt was moved to the Raw brand as a result of the Superstar Shake-up, it was made a non-title match and scheduled for Raw's Payback on April 30, which he lost.

On the April 18 episode of SmackDown Live, Jinder Mahal, who was moved to the SmackDown brand as a result of the Superstar Shake-up, won a six-pack challenge to become the number one contender for the WWE Championship, after interference from The Singh Brothers. The following week on SmackDown Live, Orton defeated Erick Rowan in a no disqualification match and was afterwards attacked by Mahal and The Singh Brothers; Mahal subsequently stole the WWE Championship belt. At Payback, Orton lost to Wyatt after Mahal attacked him with the title belt. SmackDown commissioner Shane McMahon later returned the belt to Orton. On May 21 at Backlash, Orton lost the WWE Championship to Mahal after interference from The Singh Brothers and failed to regain it the following month at Money in the Bank after The Singh Brothers again interfered. On the June 27 episode of SmackDown Live, Orton demanded a rematch for the title, which McMahon would grant him at Battleground, but with Mahal allowed to choose the stipulation (Mahal came out and chose a Punjabi Prison match). At Battleground, Orton was again defeated by Mahal when The Great Khali returned and attacked Orton, allowing Mahal to escape the Punjabi Prison to win.

United States Champion (2017–2018) 

Orton started a feud with Rusev, whom he defeated in 10 seconds at SummerSlam. On the September 5 episode of SmackDown Live, Orton lost to Shinsuke Nakamura in a number one contender's match for the WWE Championship. On the September 19 episode of SmackDown Live, Orton defeated Aiden English; after the match, he was challenged by Rusev to an impromptu match, which he lost in 10 seconds after a distraction from English. At Hell in a Cell, Orton defeated Rusev to end the feud. On the October 24 episode of SmackDown Live, Orton defeated Sami Zayn to qualify for a spot on Team SmackDown at Survivor Series. During the match, Orton eliminated Finn Bálor and survived until only he and Team SmackDown captain Shane McMahon remained, but was eliminated by Braun Strowman. Team SmackDown ultimately went on to lose. At the Royal Rumble, Orton entered Royal Rumble match at #24 and eliminated NXT Champion Andrade "Cien" Almas before later being eliminated by Roman Reigns.

During the following months, Orton was put in the orbit of the WWE United States Championship. He defeated the champion Bobby Roode at Fastlane  (thus becoming the 18th Grand Slam Champion) but lost it at WrestleMania 34 against Jinder Mahal in a fatal four-way match also involving Roode and Rusev. He had another title match at Backlash against the new champion Jeff Hardy, but Orton lost again. On May 18, WWE confirmed that Orton had undergone successful surgery to repair a medial meniscus tear in his left knee, sidelining him indefinitely.

Return of the Legend Killer (2018–2021) 
After a brief hiatus, Orton returned at Extreme Rules and attacked Jeff Hardy after Hardy's match against Shinsuke Nakamura for the United States Championship, turning heel in the process. Two nights later on SmackDown Live, Orton interfered in the rematch and attacked Hardy again. On the August 21 episode of SmackDown Live, Orton and Hardy faced off in a match that ended in a no-contest, with Hardy continuing to attack Orton after the match. At Hell in a Cell, Orton defeated Hardy in a Hell in a Cell match. On the October 9 episode of SmackDown Live, Orton defeated a returning Big Show to qualify for the WWE World Cup at Crown Jewel. At Crown Jewel, he lost to Rey Mysterio in the first round. He then started a feud with Mysterio, stealing Mysterio's mask on the November 21 episode of SmackDown Live and carrying it with him for a few weeks. At TLC, Orton lost to Mysterio in a chairs match. At the Royal Rumble pay-per-view on January 27, 2019, Orton entered the namesake match at number 29, eliminating Mysterio before he was himself eliminated by Andrade. Orton competed in the Elimination Chamber match for the WWE Championship at Elimination Chamber, where he eliminated AJ Styles before being eliminated by Kofi Kingston.

He then started a feud with Styles, with the two berating each other about their history in the wrestling business. At WrestleMania 35, Orton lost to Styles. In July, Orton feuded with Kingston over the WWE Championship, having matches at SummerSlam and Clash of Champions, where Orton did not win the title. At Crown Jewel and Survivor Series, Orton was part of two multi-tag matches, but his team lost both times. As part of the 2019 WWE draft, Orton was drafted to Raw. On the November 11 episode of Raw, Orton seemed like he was going to give Ricochet an RKO, but instead gave one to AJ Styles (who turned heel during the summer), thus turning face. He reignited his feud with Styles and faced him throughout December and January.

At the Royal Rumble on January 26, 2020, Orton entered the titular match at number 25 and eliminated Karl Anderson before he was eliminated by his former Rated-RKO tag team partner Edge, who was returning to competition for the first time since retiring due to career-ending neck injuries in 2011. The next night on Raw, Orton teased a Rated-RKO reunion with Edge before delivering an RKO and a con-chair-to, turning heel once again. Orton and Edge then began a feud, facing each other in a Last Man Standing match at WrestleMania 36, which Orton lost. Their second match at Backlash, billed as the "Greatest Wrestling Match Ever", was won by Orton. Orton won after a punt to the head of Edge, marking the first punt Orton had delivered in years. The match put Edge out of action with a legitimate torn triceps, and the victory enabled Orton to call himself the "Greatest Wrestler Ever". The following night on Raw, Edge's friend and former tag team partner Christian challenged Orton to an unsanctioned match, which Orton won with assistance from Ric Flair. Orton would go on to revive his Legend Killer gimmick over the next few weeks, attacking legends such as Christian, Shawn Michaels, and Big Show, while becoming more unhinged. Orton then turned on Flair and set his sights on the WWE Championship. During the following months, Orton feuded with the WWE Champion Drew McIntyre, failing to win the title at SummerSlam and Clash of Champions in an Ambulance match, until he defeated McIntyre in a Hell in a Cell match at Hell In A Cell, winning his tenth WWE Championship. However, he would lose the title back to McIntyre on the November 16 episode of Raw.

Three weeks before his title loss, on October 26, 2020, Orton started a feud with Bray Wyatt, now under his new gimmick, The Fiend, as well with his partner Alexa Bliss. At TLC: Tables, Ladders & Chairs on December 20, Orton defeated The Fiend in a Firefly Inferno match before setting his body on fire. Despite his victory over the Fiend, Orton would deal with the repercussions by dealing with Alexa Bliss (who aligned with The Fiend earlier) over the following weeks. After instigating Triple H into agreeing to face him in a No Holds Barred match, Bliss interfered and threw a fireball at Orton to end it in a no contest. At the Royal Rumble on January 31, Orton entered as the second participant and continued his feud with a returning Edge, who entered as the first participant. Due to injuries inflicted on him by Edge, Orton left the match to be tended to by medical personnel without actually being eliminated. Orton returned to the match at the very end to eliminate Edge, but was then himself eliminated. The following night on Raw, Orton challenged Edge to one final match to again try to end his wrestling career but was defeated by him due to the interference of Bliss.

At Elimination Chamber on February 21, Orton competed in the Raw Elimination Chamber match for Drew McIntyre's WWE Championship, but was the first man eliminated by Kofi Kingston. After Bliss repeatedly harassed and distracted him over the weeks, causing him to lose matches, Bliss challenged him to an Intergender Match at Fastlane on March 21, which he accepted. At the event, Bliss attacked him with supernatural powers and Orton lost after interference from The Fiend. On the following episode of Raw, The Fiend attacked Orton again and a match between them was scheduled for WrestleMania 37. On Night 2 of the event on April 11, Orton defeated The Fiend after Bliss seemingly turned on The Fiend by distracting him, allowing Orton to land the RKO and pin him for the win.

RK-Bro (2021–2022) 

After WrestleMania, Orton began to work with Riddle as a tag team, named RK-Bro, thus turning face in the process. They would defeat AJ Styles and Omos at SummerSlam to become the Raw Tag Team Champions, their first reign each. RK-Bro defeated Styles and Omos in a rematch at Crown Jewel to successfully retain the championships and end the feud between the two teams. At Survivor Series, RK-Bro defeated SmackDown Tag Team Champions The Usos (Jey Uso and Jimmy Uso). With this match, Orton broke Kane's record for wrestling the most PPV matches in WWE history. At the inaugural Day 1 premium live-event, Orton and Riddle successfully defended their championships against The Street Profits.

On the January 10, 2022 episode of Raw, RK-Bro lost the Raw Tag Team Championship to Alpha Academy (Chad Gable and Otis), ending their reign at 142 days. However, exactly eight weeks later on the March 7 edition of the Raw, they regained the Raw Tag Team Championship in a Triple Threat match against Alpha Academy and the team of Kevin Owens and Seth Rollins. The win gave Orton and Riddle each their second Raw Tag Team Championship reign and Orton's fourth tag team championship reign overall. Later, during the Royal Rumble, Orton entered the namesake contest as the penultimate entrant, scoring two eliminations before being eliminated by eventual winner Brock Lesnar. At WrestleMania 38, RK-Bro successfully defended the Raw Tag Team Championship against Alpha Academy and the Street Profits in a triple threat tag team match. After the match, the duo would celebrate with new WWE signee Gable Steveson. Following WrestleMania, RK-Bro would be challenged by The Usos to a championship unification match at WrestleMania Backlash with, both the Raw and SmackDown Tag Team Championships on the line. Orton would later accept the challenge on RK-Bro's behalf. On the April 25 episode of Raw, WWE and Riddle celebrated "20 Years of Orton" to open the show. In the main event, RK-Bro teamed with Ezekiel and Cody Rhodes to defeat the team of the Usos, Seth Rollins, and Kevin Owens, after Orton delivered four RKOs.

The WrestleMania Backlash match between RK-Bro and the Usos was later changed to a six-man tag team non-title match pitting Drew McIntyre and RK-Bro against The Bloodline, in which the latter emerged victorious when Roman Reigns pinned Riddle. The following night on Raw, RK-Bro successfully defended the Raw Tag Team Championships against the Street Profits. On the May 20 episode of SmackDown, following interference from Reigns, the Usos defeated RK-Bro to unify the Raw and SmackDown Tag Team Championships. A few days later, it was announced that Orton had suffered a legitimate back injury and was expected to be on hiatus for the rest of 2022.

Professional wrestling style and persona 

Orton's most notable move is his finishing maneuver, the RKO, a jumping variation of a cutter. The name is a pun on his initials (Randal Keith Orton) with "Randy-KO". He also previously used a punt kick, which saw him run up to an opponent on their hands and knees and kick them in the head; within a storyline, this usually caused a concussion or some other sort of severe head injury to his opponent, and was often used to write off the on-screen characters of wrestlers who were scheduled to take time off. However, the move was legitimately banned by WWE management in 2012 due to the ease of imitation by viewers and the risk of injury should the move be botched. The move was brought back in June 2020 as part of the feud between Orton and Edge where Orton used the Punt Kick to defeat Edge at Backlash. Orton would then start using the move regularly again.

During his initial years in WWE, Orton's gimmick was that of "the Legend Killer", a young and cocky talent who disrespected and usually defeated several legends. In late 2007, in the midst of his second WWE Championship reign, his character changed to a more unstable and treacherous personality. He then adopted the nicknames of "the Viper" and "the Apex Predator" due to his untrustworthy, snake-like character. He has said numerous times that he prefers playing the villain, as it is easier and more natural for him. In January 2008, Orton told 411Mania: "It's easy for me to go out there and be a prick on the show because it's me times ten. And even though you probably don't like me anyway, give me five minutes and I'll make you not like me more. Being a heel is fun. It comes so natural."

Acting career 
A former Marine, Orton was set to star in the action film The Marine 2 (2009), but was replaced by Ted DiBiase after injuring his collarbone. He had a supporting role as the father of a school bully in the comedy-drama film That's What I Am (2011). He signed on to star in the action film The Marine 3: Homefront (2013), but was replaced by The Miz due to his checkered military career. He later starred in the action films 12 Rounds 2: Reloaded (2013) and The Condemned 2 (2015). He had a guest role as James Richards, a former Navy SEAL and leader of a militia group, in a December 2016 episode of the USA action series Shooter. He also had supporting roles in the comedy-drama film Changeland (2019) and the romantic comedy film Long Shot (2019).

Other media 
In 2004, Orton appeared on the talk show Jimmy Kimmel Live! to promote Taboo Tuesday. In March 2007, he appeared alongside Edge, John Cena and Bobby Lashley on the game show Deal or No Deal. He was the cover athlete for the video game WWE '12.

In October 2014, he became a popular figure on Vine and the internet, when a trend began of clips of a superimposed Orton performing his signature RKO move on internet "fail" victims.

Personal life 
Orton married Samantha Speno on September 21, 2007. The couple had a daughter together. They separated in late 2012 and divorced in June 2013. On November 14, 2015, Orton married Kimberly Kessler, who was previously a member of his fan club. The couple have a daughter together (Orton's second child). They reside in St. Charles, Missouri.

Orton suffers from hypermobility in both of his shoulders, which has been the cause of nearly all of his injuries throughout his career, sidelining him through incidents ranging from performing one of his signature taunts during a match to innocuous things such as taking out the trash at home.

Controversies and legal issues 
In March 2007, Sports Illustrated posted an article on its website as part of its continuing series investigating a steroid and growth hormone ring used by a number of professional athletes in several sports. The article mentioned several current and former WWE wrestlers, including Orton, who was alleged to have obtained nandrolone, oxandrolone, stanozolol, and testosterone, as well as ancillary drugs anastrozole and clomiphene citrate. WWE simply claimed that the allegations preceded their Talent Wellness Program, launched in February 2006.

In August 2018, Orton was investigated by WWE for sexual harassment when it was claimed that he had exposed himself to new members of the company's writing staff during his early career, though nothing came of the investigation.

In 2018, Orton's tattoo artist Catherine Alexander filed a lawsuit against Take-Two Interactive and 2K Games for their unapproved use of her copyrighted tattoos on his likeness in their WWE 2K video game series. She argued that the copying of the tattoos infringed on her rights as the licensed creator. A trial was scheduled for September 2021, but was postponed due to the COVID-19 pandemic. The trial went ahead in October 2022, with the judge ruling in favor of Alexander and declaring that she was entitled to $3,750 in damages.

In October 2019, Orton received criticism for saying "nigga" while playing a Call of Duty game on a live Twitch stream.

Filmography

Film

Television

Championships and accomplishments 

 The Baltimore Sun
 Wrestler of the Year (2009)
 Guinness Book of World Records
 Most appearances on pay-per-view for a male WWE wrestler
 Ohio Valley Wrestling
 OVW Hardcore Championship (2 times)
 Pro Wrestling Illustrated
 Feud of the Year (2009) 
 Most Hated Wrestler of the Year (2007, 2009)
 Most Improved Wrestler of the Year (2004)
 Most Popular Wrestler of the Year (2010)
 Rookie of the Year (2001)
 Wrestler of the Year (2009, 2010)
 Ranked No. 1 of the top 500 singles wrestlers in the PWI 500 in 2008
 World Wrestling Entertainment/WWE
 WWE Championship (10 times)
 World Heavyweight Championship (4 times)
 WWE Intercontinental Championship (1 time)
 WWE United States Championship (1 time)
 World Tag Team Championship (1 time) – with Edge
WWE Raw Tag Team Championship (2 times) – with Riddle
 WWE SmackDown Tag Team Championship (1 time) – with Bray Wyatt and Luke Harper
 Money in the Bank (2013)
 Royal Rumble (2009, 2017)
 Seventeenth Triple Crown Champion
 Tenth Grand Slam Champion (under current format; eighteenth overall)
 Slammy Award (2 times)
 Hashtag of the Year (2014) – 
 Rivalry of the Year (2020) 
 WWE Year-End Award for Shocking Moment of the Year (2018) – 
 Wrestling Observer Newsletter
 Most Improved (2004)
 Most Disgusting Promotional Tactic (2006) Exploiting the death of Eddie Guerrero ("Eddie's down there... in Hell!" promo)
 Most Overrated (2013)
 Worst Feud of the Year (2013) – 
 Worst Feud of the Year (2017) 
 Worst Feud of the Year (2021) 
 Worst Worked Match of the Year (2017)

Footnotes

References

Further reading

External links 

 
 
 
 

1980 births
Living people
21st-century American male actors
American male film actors
American male professional wrestlers
Male actors from St. Louis
Male actors from Tennessee
NWA/WCW/WWE United States Heavyweight Champions
People from St. Charles, Missouri
Professional wrestlers from Missouri
Professional wrestlers from Tennessee
Sportspeople from Knoxville, Tennessee
Sportspeople from St. Louis
The Authority (professional wrestling) members
United States Marines
World Heavyweight Champions (WWE)
WWE Champions
WWE Grand Slam champions
WWF/WWE Intercontinental Champions
United States Marine Corps personnel who were court-martialed
21st-century professional wrestlers